is a Japanese professional three-cushion billiards player.

In 1998, Umeda finished 2nd to fellow Japanese Akio Shimada in the three-cushion event of the Asian Games. He later won it against Duong Anh Vu of Vietnam in 2006.
A year afterward, he dominated the UMB World Three-cushion Championship by defeating Daniel Sánchez, the two-time world champion from Spain. With the victory, he became the second Asian to win it in 34 years since Nobuaki Kobayashi.

References 

Japanese carom billiards players
World champions in three-cushion billiards
1968 births
Living people
Sportspeople from Tokyo
Asian Games medalists in cue sports
Cue sports players at the 1998 Asian Games
Cue sports players at the 2006 Asian Games
Asian Games gold medalists for Japan
Asian Games silver medalists for Japan
Medalists at the 1998 Asian Games
Medalists at the 2006 Asian Games
Competitors at the 2005 World Games